Jorge Prado may refer to:
Jorge del Prado Chávez (1910–1999), Peruvian politician
Jorge Prado (footballer, born 1982), Spanish footballer
Jorge Prado (footballer, born 1995), Colombian footballer
Jorge Prado (motocross racer) (born 2001), Spanish motocross racer